John Stackhouse (born 1962) is a Canadian journalist and author. He graduated from Queen's University in 1985 with a Bachelor of Commerce degree. While at Queen's, he served as editor of the Queen's Journal, and won the Tricolour Award in 1985.

He joined The Globe and Mail in 1992. He was the editor of The Globe and Mail's Report on Business section. On May 25, 2009, he was promoted to editor-in-chief of the newspaper, replacing Edward Greenspon. On March 19, 2014, he was, in turn, replaced by David Walmsley.

Since January 2015, Stackhouse has been the Senior Vice-President, Office of the CEO, at the Royal Bank of Canada, in such capacity he has an "advisory role, where he will be “responsible for gathering and interpreting global economic, business, political and social trends and providing the leadership team and board with insights". Additionally, Stackhouse "has joined the boards of the C.D. Howe Institute and World Literacy Canada and become a senior fellow at the University of Toronto's Munk School of Global Affairs. He also signed a two-book deal with Knopf Random House Canada."

Awards and recognition
 1994: winner, National Newspaper Awards, one prize for Feature Writing
 1997: winner, National Newspaper Awards, two prizes for Business Reporting and International Reporting
 1999: winner, National Newspaper Awards, two prizes for Feature Writing and International Reporting

Bibliography
 2000: Out of Poverty: And Into Something More Comfortable (Random House), 
 2003: Timbit Nation: A Hitchhiker's View of Canada (Random House), 
 2015: Mass Disruption: Thirty Years on the Front Lines of a Media Revolution (Random House Canada),

References

External links

1962 births
Living people
Canadian male journalists
Canadian male non-fiction writers
Canadian newspaper editors
Queen's University at Kingston alumni
Canadian non-fiction writers
The Globe and Mail editors
Canadian business and financial journalists